Vaselga (Wasyılğa) is a rural locality (a village) in Maygazinsky Selsoviet, Belokataysky District, Bashkortostan, Russia. The population was 178 as of 2010. There are 3 streets.

Geography 
Vaselga is located 28 km southwest of Novobelokatay (the district's administrative centre) by road. Abzayevo is the nearest rural locality.

References 

Rural localities in Belokataysky District